The 1905 Victorian Football Association season was the 29th season of the Australian rules football competition. The premiership was won by the Richmond Football Club, after defeating minor premiers  by 25 points in the challenge final on 7 October. It was Richmond's second VFA premiership.

Association membership 
The Association membership was unchanged in 1905, but the Essendon Town Football Club changed its name to the Essendon Football Club at its annual general meeting in March, feeling entitled to do so as the only senior club playing its games in the town of Essendon at the time. As a consequence of this, there were two distinct senior Essendon Football Clubs with the same name playing in Melbourne from 1905 until 1921: one in the VFL, based in East Melbourne; and one in the VFA, based in Essendon.

At the time, the two Essendon clubs were typically known as Essendon (Association) and Essendon (League), Essendon (V.F.A.) and Essendon (V.F.L.), or Essendon (A.) and Essendon (L.) to distinguish them from each other where confusion was possible.

Premiership 
The home-and-away season was played over eighteen rounds, with each club playing the others twice; then, the top four clubs contested a finals series under the amended Argus system to determine the premiers for the season.

Ladder

Finals

Semi-finals

Final

Grand Final

External links 
 Victorian Football Association/Victorian Football League History (1877-2008)
 List of VFA/VFL Premiers (1877–2007)

References 

Victorian Football League seasons
VFL